Ben is a Canadian comic strip syndicated by MWAM and available on GoComics that is also included in American and other English-speaking newspapers. There is also a French version. It is the creation of artist and author Daniel Shelton.

Characters
Ben Hatley, a recent retiree from Oshawa, Ontario.
Olivia Hatley, Ben's wife, a retired schoolteacher.
Patty Tokoname, Ben and Olivia's daughter, a sales rep and soccer coach.
Nathan Tokoname, Patty's husband, a graphic artist. He is of Japanese heritage.
Nicholas Tokoname, Patty and Nathan's oldest child, an eight-year-old boy with black hair often seen wearing a striped shirt.
Michael Tokoname,  Patty and Nathan's second child, a brown-haired six-year-old boy.
Alec Tokoname, Patty and Nathan's third child, a red-haired four-year-old.
Mia Tokoname, Patty and Nathan's fourth child and only daughter, aged two.
Max, a golden retriever.
George Tokoname, Nathan's father.
Ann Tokoname, Nathan's mother.
Although the main character is a retiree, the comic strip prefers not to limit itself to the typical senior citizen stereotypes, opting instead to show seniors as modern and vibrant.

References

External links
 
 Ben on GoComics

Canadian comic strips
Comics about married people